Pwll is a small coastal village, located between Llanelli and Burry Port, Carmarthenshire, Wales.

Description
Pwll has a local shop, pet shop, Post Office located in The Blue Anchor (Wednesdays and Fridays 12:00 until 15:00), a few pubs, a steakhouse restaurant (The Bryngwyn) a primary school and local football teams senior and junior  and previously cricket until the team folded. The village is concentrated along the north of the A484. The land rises away from the coast providing a view of the Gower Peninsula (Penrhyn Gŵyr). The area is also where the Millennium Coastal Path runs through allowing cyclists to get between Burry Port and Llanelli without the need of Cycling on the congested road during commuting hours.

Aviation history
On 17 June 1928 pioneering aviatrix Amelia Earhart landed near the village in a Fokker F.VIIb/3m after flying exactly 20 hours and 40 minutes non-stop from Trepassey Harbor, Newfoundland. She became the first woman to fly non-stop across the Atlantic. A commemorative blue plaque now marks the site. As most of the flight was on instruments and because Earhart had no training for this type of flying, she did not pilot the aircraft. When interviewed after landing, she said, "Stultz did all the flying—had to. I was just baggage, like a sack of potatoes." She added, "... maybe someday I'll try it alone." In 1932 she completed her solo transatlantic flight.

Citations

Villages in Carmarthenshire
Llanelli Rural